Absiella argi  is a Gram-positive bacterium from the genus of Absiella which has been isolated from the feces of a dog.

References 

Erysipelotrichia
Bacteria described in 2017